Talbot Dilworth-Harrison (5 July 1886 – 16 May 1975) was Archdeacon of Chesterfield from 1934 until 1943.

He was educated at Dean Close School, Keble College, Oxford and Ripon College Cuddesdon. He was a Lecturer at St Boniface Missionary College, Warminster from 1907 until 1908; Curate at  StMary, Prestwich from 1909 to 1917; Vicar of Ringley from 1917 to 1927; and Vicar of St Bartholomew, Brighton before his time as Archdeacon  and Vicar of Edingley afterwards.

Notes

1886 births
People educated at Dean Close School
Alumni of Keble College, Oxford
Alumni of Ripon College Cuddesdon
Archdeacons of Chesterfield
1975 deaths